Evan Jay Crane (February 14, 1889 – December 30, 1966) was an American chemist and the editor of Chemical Abstracts 1915–1958.

He graduated from Ohio State University in 1911, and received an Honorary D.Sc. there in 1938.

In 1951 he was awarded the Priestley Medal, the highest honour of the American Chemical Society, and in 1953 the Austin M. Patterson Award.

In 1958, at the 134th national meeting of the American Chemical Society, Crane was presented with a commemorative scroll from the ACS Division of Chemical Literature, worded as follows:

Publications
A Guide to the Literature of Chemistry, by E. J. Crane and Austin M. Patterson (Wiley, 1927) (2nd edition: 1957, with Eleanor B. Marr)

References

External links
Photograph of Crane in the Smithsonian Institution Archives
A Guide to the Literature of Chemistry (1927) full text at Internet Archive

1889 births
1966 deaths
20th-century American chemists
Cheminformatics
Place of birth missing
Ohio State University alumni